Stefano Scognamillo (born 4 May 1994) is an Italian football player of Russian origin. He plays as a defender for  club Catanzaro. He also holds Russian citizenship.

Career

Ascoli
He is the product of youth teams of Ascoli and played for their Under-19 squad from 2010–11 to 2012–13 seasons. He made his Serie C debut for Ascoli's senior squad on 1 September 2013 in a game against Frosinone as a starter.

Loan to Aversa Normanna
On 28 August 2014, he joined Aversa Normanna in Serie C for a season-long loan.

Matera
He joined Matera in the summer of 2015 and extended his contract with the club on 20 June 2017.

Parma

Loan to Trapani
He signed with Serie A club Parma in July 2018. On 11 August 2018, he was loaned to Serie C club Trapani for one season.

Trapani
On 29 July 2019, he moved to Trapani on a permanent basis, signing a two-year contract.

Alessandria
On 9 September 2020 he joined Alessandria on a 2-year contract.

Catanzaro
On 15 January 2021, he moved to Catanzaro on loan.

On 3 August 2021, he returned to Catanzaro on permanent basis.

References

External links
 

1994 births
Living people
Footballers from Saint Petersburg
Italian people of Russian descent
Russian emigrants to Italy
Italian footballers
Russian footballers
Association football defenders
Serie B players
Serie C players
Ascoli Calcio 1898 F.C. players
S.F. Aversa Normanna players
Matera Calcio players
Parma Calcio 1913 players
Trapani Calcio players
U.S. Alessandria Calcio 1912 players
U.S. Catanzaro 1929 players